Léon Letsch (born 23 May 1927) is a Luxembourgish former footballer who played as a striker. He was a member of the Luxembourg national football team from 1947 to 1961. He also played for Luxembourg at the 1952 Summer Olympics.

References

External links

Léon Letsch's profile at Sports Reference.com
Article on Léon Letsch's 90th birthday 

1927 births
Living people
People from Mamer
Association football forwards
Luxembourgian footballers
Luxembourgian expatriate footballers
Luxembourg international footballers
CA Spora Luxembourg players
Olympic footballers of Luxembourg
CO Roubaix-Tourcoing players
Ligue 1 players
Footballers at the 1952 Summer Olympics
Expatriate footballers in France
Luxembourgian expatriate sportspeople in France